Parliamentary elections were held in Madagascar on 17 May 1998. AREMA, the party led by President Didier Ratsiraka, emerged as the largest faction in the National Assembly, winning 63 of the 150 seats. However, independent candidates won more votes than any party.

Results

References

Elections in Madagascar
Madagascar
Parliamentary election
Malagasy parliamentary election
Election and referendum articles with incomplete results